Henry Stephen Dunks (7 June 1882 – 22 March 1955) was an Australian politician. He was a Liberal and Country League member of the South Australian House of Assembly from 1933 to 1955, representing Sturt until 1938 and Mitcham thereafter.

References

 

1882 births
1955 deaths
Liberal and Country League politicians
Members of the South Australian House of Assembly
Place of birth missing
20th-century Australian politicians